Winston Carelse (born 24 August 1945) is a South African cricketer. He played in eight first-class matches between 1971 and 1978.

See also
 International cricket in South Africa from 1971 to 1981

References

External links
 

1945 births
Living people
South African cricketers
Place of birth missing (living people)